Frank Miller (December 17, 1867 – November 2, 1942) was an American Negro league infielder in the 1880s and 1890s.

A native of Cumberland, Maryland, Miller made his Negro leagues debut in 1887 with the Pittsburgh Keystones and the Cuban Giants. He played for the Giants again in 1891, and also played for the New York Gorhams that season. Miller finished his career in 1896 with the Cuban X-Giants. He died in Pittsburgh, Pennsylvania in 1942 at age 74.

References

External links
Baseball statistics and player information from Baseball-Reference Black Baseball Stats and Seamheads

1867 births
1942 deaths
Cuban Giants players
Cuban X-Giants players
New York Gorhams players
Pittsburgh Keystones players
Baseball infielders
Baseball players from Maryland
Sportspeople from Cumberland, Maryland